The discography of American singer-songwriter and producer Caroline Polachek consists of four studio albums, one remix album, one instrumental album, two extended plays, 13 singles, and seven promotional singles. Polachek previously released music under the names Ramona Lisa and CEP, before releasing her debut album under her real name in 2019. She also issued three albums as a member of the band Chairlift, from 2008 to 2016.

Albums

Studio albums

Instrumental albums

Remix albums

Extended plays

Singles

As lead artist

Promotional singles

As featured artist

Guest appearances

Remixes

Songwriting and production credits

Music videos

Notes

References

Discographies of American artists
Pop music discographies
Electronic music discographies